I Freak Out is the second extended play by Australian melodic punk/alternative rock band The Hard Aches, released on 9 September 2016 by Anchorhead Records.

Background and promotion
In February 2016, the band went to Birdland Studios in Melbourne to record their second EP, working with producer Lindsay Gravina (who'd previously worked on albums for The Living End and Magic Dirt) to create the bands first record not managed entirely by David and Upton themselves.

In May 2016, The Hard Aches released the single "Glad That You’re Gone", which was added to Triple J's full rotation. The song, along with its accompanying music video, were well received by critics and fans. In August 2016, the band announced the upcoming release of their second EP. 

The Hard Aches released their second extended play, I Freak Out, in September 2016. The six-track EP spawned a second single, "Gut Full", which also received a music video on 16 September 2016.

Critical reception

The extended play received positive reviews, and marked the band's first-ever appearance on the ARIA Album Charts. The Brag praised the EP, saying "I Freak Out cements The Hard Aches as a band to watch, cramming emotionally and musically dense content into every second, leaving the release bursting at the seams". Metratone gave the album a positive review, stating: "amongst all the catchy guitar riffs and belt worthy lyrics, the only complaint I have is that I don’t want it to end".

Track listing
Track listing adapted from BandCamp.

Personnel
The Hard Aches
 Ben David – lead vocals, guitar
 Alex Upton – drums

Production
 Lindsay Gravina – producer, mixing and mastering
 Brenton Conlan – audio engineer

Design
 Elliot Oakes - photography
 Chris Cowburn - artwork

Charts

Release history

References

2016 EPs
The Hard Aches EPs